Alexandre Geniez (born 16 April 1988) is a French professional cyclist, who last rode for UCI ProTeam .

In March 2022 Geniez was convicted of domestic violence charges and given a four month suspended prison sentence.
On 31 May 2022  terminated his contract effective immediately.

Career 
One of his prestigious feats was winning the white jersey awarded to the best young rider in the 2011 Tour de Luxembourg.

Geniez left  at the end of the 2012 season, and joined  for the 2013 season.

In April 2015, Geniez won the Tro Bro Leon, a race cycled on asphalt and sandy roads, outsprinting four breakaway companions to accomplish the feat.

In August 2020, Geniez signed a two-year contract with the  team, from the 2021 season.

Major results

2009
 1st  Overall Ronde de l'Isard
 2nd Overall Tour de Gironde
 7th Overall Giro della Valle d'Aosta
1st Stage 4
2010
 2nd Overall Route du Sud
 6th Les Boucles du Sud-Ardèche
 7th Overall Tour de Luxembourg
2011
 1st Stage 4 Tour of Austria
 2nd Overall Tour de Luxembourg
1st  Young rider classification
 4th Overall Critérium International
 5th Overall Circuit de la Sarthe
 6th Overall Vuelta a Murcia
2012
 8th Overall Circuit de la Sarthe
 9th Overall Tour de Pologne
2013
 1st Stage 15 Vuelta a España
 9th Overall Tour Méditerranéen
2014
 4th Overall Volta ao Algarve
2015
 1st  Overall Tour de l'Ain
1st Stage 3
 1st Tro-Bro Léon
 4th Tour du Finistère
 9th Overall Giro d'Italia
 9th Tour du Doubs
  Combativity award Stage 20 Tour de France
2016
 Vuelta a España
1st Stage 3 
Held  after Stages 3–4
Held  after Stages 3–7
 3rd Tour du Finistère
 6th Overall Tour de l'Ain
1st Stage 4
 7th Overall La Méditerranéenne
1st Stage 1 (TTT)
 9th Overall Critérium International
2017
 1st Tre Valli Varesine
 3rd Overall Tour de l'Ain
1st  Points classification
1st Stage 4
 3rd Overall Tour La Provence
1st Stage 2
  Combativity award Stage 3 Vuelta a España
2018
 1st  Overall Tour La Provence
1st Prologue
 1st Grand Prix La Marseillaise
 1st Stage 12 Vuelta a España
2019
 1st Stage 2 Tour de l'Ain
 8th Classic Loire Atlantique
2022
 Tour du Rwanda
1st Prologue & Stage 5
 8th Overall Saudi Tour

Grand Tour general classification results timeline

References

External links

 

Living people
1988 births
French male cyclists
French Vuelta a España stage winners
People from Rodez
Sportspeople from Aveyron
Cyclists from Occitania (administrative region)
People convicted of assault
21st-century French people